Mona Chollet is a Swiss journalist and author. She is chief editor at Le Monde diplomatique since 2016. Her best-seller Sorcières (In Defense of Witches) has sold 370,000 copies in France. Born in Geneva in 1973, she is known as a feminist figure in France.

Books 
 2015 : Beauté fatale
 2018 : Sorcières : La puissance invaincue des femmes, La Découverte 
 2021 : Réinventer l'amour (Reinventing love), Zones  
 2022 : In Defense of Witches: The Legacy of the Witch Hunts and Why Women Are Still on Trial, translated by Sophie R. Lewis, Macmillan Publishers

References 
 

1973 births
Living people
21st-century Swiss journalists
Swiss essayists
Writers from Geneva